Sunny Choi (born November 10, 1988), also known mononymously as Sunny, is an American breakdancer. She participated at the 2022 World Games in the dancesport competition where she won the silver medal in the B-Girls event.

References 

1988 births
Living people
Place of birth missing (living people)
American female dancers
American breakdancers
World Games silver medalists
Competitors at the 2022 World Games
20th-century American women
21st-century American women